Tom Conaghan is an Irish Gaelic football figure who managed Donegal county football teams during the 1980s and, later, the Sligo senior team. His former players regarded him as a disciplinarian in his approach to management.

Conaghan managed Donegal to the 1982 All-Ireland Under-21 Football Championship. He later took over from Brian McEniff as senior manager when McEniff had led the 1983 Ulster Senior Football Championship campaign to a win.

Over the course of his time as senior manager during the 1980s, Conaghan fell out with numerous players. He dropped Marty Carlin and Charlie Mulgrew from his team for one year after they played for Letterkenny in a Forster Cup final victory at Ravenhill in 1987. Other players with whom he fell out during his time as senior manager included Declan Bonner, Manus Boyle, Matt Gallagher, Barry McGowan and Sylvester Maguire. Conaghan's spell as county manager ended with a heavy defeat to Tyrone. McEniff, returning to the senior job for a fourth time in September 1989, restored many of those with whom Conaghan had fallen out to the panel in time for the 1990 Ulster Senior Football Championship, which Donegal won.

Conaghan later managed the Sligo seniors. He was mentioned as a possible successor to P. J. McGowan as Donegal manager in 1997 in a dual role with Anthony Molloy. He withdrew and Declan Bonner became manager.

In later years, Conaghan became involved in politics and sat as an independent on Donegal County Council. He first stood for election in 2009 but did not win a seat. He won a seat in 2014 and retained it in 2019. He was elected Cathaoirleach of the Donegal Municipal District on 13 June 2017.

References

Year of birth missing (living people)
Living people
Gaelic football managers
Independent politicians in Ireland
Irish sportsperson-politicians
Local councillors in County Donegal
Politicians from County Donegal